Stella Dallas is a 1925 American silent drama film that was produced by Samuel Goldwyn, adapted by Frances Marion, and directed by Henry King. The film stars Ronald Colman, Belle Bennett, Lois Moran, Alice Joyce, Jean Hersholt, and Douglas Fairbanks Jr. Prints of the film survive in several film archives.

This was the first feature film adaptation of the 1923 novel Stella Dallas by Olive Higgins Prouty. Subsequent film versions were Stella Dallas (1937) and Stella (1990).

Plot
As described in a review in a 1925 film magazine, upon the suicide of his father who has embezzled funds, Stephen Dallas (Colman), reared in luxury, forsakes his sweetheart Helen (Joyce) and hides in a mill town. Lonely, he succumbs to the blandishments of Stella (Bennett). For a while their married life is happy and a baby girl is born. Stella, however, never rises to Stephen's social level. She dresses gaudily, her ideas and tastes are crude, her boon companion is a horseman of the coarse type. Stephen finally leaves her but agrees she can keep their child, Laurel. Years pass. Laurel (Moran) grows up. Stella comes to the realization that she is a drag on Laurel who takes after her father. Stifling her pride she agrees to a divorce so that Stephen can marry Helen, now a widow, to provide Laurel with a proper home and "mother," but Laurel refuses to leave her own mother. Stella, deciding that no sacrifice is too great for her daughter's happiness, hunts up her friend Ed (Hersholt), now a drunkard, and tells Laurel she is going to marry him and sends her to visit her father claiming that she and Ed are going away for a year. Laurel resumes her romance with a fine young fellow and they are married, while Stella in the rain outside watches the ceremony and leaves weeping, but happy that her sacrifice has not been in vain.

Cast

References

External links

Stills at Alice Joyce, stanford.edu
United Artists Pressbook on the Internet Archive
Stella Dallas program notes for 2012 San Francisco Silent Film Festival

1925 films
1925 drama films
American silent feature films
Silent American drama films
American black-and-white films
1920s English-language films
Films about social class
Films directed by Henry King
Films with screenplays by Frances Marion
Samuel Goldwyn Productions films
United Artists films
1920s American films